Thomas Brothers Store, also known as Biglerville Country Store, is a historic general store and residential building located at Biglerville in Adams County, Pennsylvania, USA. It was built in 1912 and is a three-story, rectangular brick building with a shed roof. It sits on a stone foundation, has a three bay front elevation with a prominent cornice and has Classical Revival style influences. Located on the third floor is a large meeting room known as Thomas Hall. Attached to the store building is a three-story, two bay house also built in 1912.

It was listed on the National Register of Historic Places in 2008.

References

External links
Thomas Brothers Country Store website

Commercial buildings on the National Register of Historic Places in Pennsylvania
Commercial buildings completed in 1912
Buildings and structures in Adams County, Pennsylvania
1912 establishments in Pennsylvania
National Register of Historic Places in Adams County, Pennsylvania